John A. Wright (born August 5, 1954) is a Republican politician from the U.S. state of Oklahoma. Wright was the Majority Caucus Chairman in the Oklahoma House of Representatives before he was soundly defeated in the Republican Party's 2010 Primary for Lieutenant Governor by the eventual winner, Todd Lamb.

Personal
Wright was born in Erie, Pennsylvania, August 5, 1954. His parents are Dr. and Mrs. Robert B. Wright. He is married to Debra Lynn (Persing), they have one child Ashley. Wright received a B.S. from Jacksonville University in Jacksonville, Florida (1976) and is a private pilot.

Political career
Wright began serving in the Oklahoma State Legislature during the 47th legislature.  Due to Oklahoma's term limits on legislators he will be term limited in 2010.  Wright announced in 2009 that he will seek the office of Oklahoma's Lieutenant Governor.  According to a poll taken June 22, 2010 by Soonerpoll.com, Wright will receive 17% of the vote in the primary election.  This puts him 7.1 points behind Todd Lamb who in the same poll got 24.1%.  The margin of error was ± 5.4%.  Wright received 17.55% of the primary's votes, a far-distant second to Todd Lamb's 66.84%.

Rep. Wright lost the Lieutenant Governor's Republican primary election to then State Senator Todd Lamb.

References

http://soonerpoll.com/many-file-for-lieutenant-governor-leader-emerges-as-primaries-loom/

1954 births
Living people
Politicians from Erie, Pennsylvania
Republican Party members of the Oklahoma House of Representatives
Jacksonville University alumni
Candidates in the 2010 United States elections